Seward Mountain or Mountains may refer to:
 Seward Mountains (Alaska), a mountain in Alaska
 Seward Mountain (Montana), a mountain in Montana
 Seward Mountains (New York), a mountain range in New York
 Seward Mountain (New York), a mountain located in the Seward Mountains